The timeline of first Earth observation satellites shows, in chronological order, those successful Earth observation satellites, that is, Earth satellites with a program of Earth science. Sputnik 1, while the first satellite ever launched, did not conduct Earth science. Explorer 1 was the first satellite to make an Earth science discovery when it found the Van Allen belts.

1950s

1960s

See also
List of Earth observation satellites

References
Claude LaFleur's The Spacecraft Encyclopedia
Encyclopedia Astronautica

Earth science satellites
Lists of satellites